Jimmy Dale Long (October 6, 1931 – August 9, 2016) was an American politician. He served as a Democratic member of the Louisiana House of Representatives.

King was born in Winn Parish, Louisiana. His relatives included George S. Long, Huey Long, Earl Long, Russell B. Long, Gillis William Long and Speedy Long. He was the brother of Gerald Long.

Long graduated from Winnfield High School and then spent seven years in the United States Navy from 1948 to 1955. Upon completion of navy service, he attended Northwestern State University. He later helped to acquire funds for building and modernization work at the university, and for infrastructure projects in his district. He was a business owner and also a cowman.

In 1968 Long was elected to the Louisiana House of Representatives, serving until 2000. Long was a member of the House Appropriations Committee and Joint Legislative Budget Committee. He took a particular interest in education, being instrumental in the establishment of Louisiana Scholars' College at Northwestern University, and the public residential high school Louisiana School for Math, Science, and the Arts.

Long died in August 2016 of traffic collision in the afternoon at 1:00 pm next to his home in Natchitoches, Louisiana, at the age of 84.  He is buried at the American Cemetery in Natchitoches, Louisiana. Long was named by The Shreveport Times as one of the "100 Most Influential People of the Century".  In 2000 he was honored in the Louisiana Political Museum and Hall of Fame.

References

1931 births
2016 deaths
20th-century American politicians
Burials in Louisiana
People from Winn Parish, Louisiana
Democratic Party members of the Louisiana House of Representatives
Northwestern State University alumni
Long family
Road incident deaths in Louisiana
Businesspeople from Louisiana
United States Navy sailors
Farmers from Louisiana